Indira Gandhi National Forest Academy (IGNFA) is a  forestry training institute under the Ministry of Environment and Forests of India, which was originally as Indian Forest College, established in 1938 for training senior forest officers. It is situated in the New Forest campus of Forest Research Institute (FRI), Dehradun. IGNFA is currently functioning as a staff college for the officers of the Indian Forest Service (IFS).

The primary mandate of the academy is to impart knowledge and skills to the professional foresters and help them to develop competence for managing the country's forest and wildlife resources on a sustainable basis. In the academy training is provided at different levels of seniority in the Indian Forest Service besides training the new entrants to the service.

History
The academy was constituted in the year 1987 by renaming the Indian Forest College, which was established in 1938 for training senior forest officers.

Training programmes

 Professional Forestry training for IFS Probationers through a series of class room sessions, tours, excursions and specialized modules. It nurtures young foresters capable of making difference in the management of ecological assets of our country besides inculcating human values and professional ethics amongst them.
 Skill Upgradation Programme for State Forest Service (SFS) officers inducted into IFS to sensitize and orient them to the ethos and functioning of All India Services and to keep them abreast with the rapidly changing scenario of forest management, development and administration.
 Mid Career Training (MCT) programme  for IFS officers in three phases of the service viz III, IV and V meant for the seniority 7 to 9, 16 to 18 and 26 to 28 years respectively. It aims to provide best training opportunities to the officers by roping in some of the leading training institutions in the country and abroad. The officers get a chance to interact with the experts of respective fields and also get exposure to best management practices of natural resources in the foreign countries.
 Training programmes and workshops for the three All India Services, members of Higher Judiciary, exposure to Officer Trainees of other services with an endeavour to provide a platform for sharing experiences and new learnings in the field of forest management.

Location
It is situated in the New Forest campus of Forest Research Institute (FRI) on Chakrata Road (NH-72),five kilometers from Dehradun town. The 1100 acres campus is bounded by the river Tons in the north and Chakrata road on the south. Large parts of the campus are still covered with natural forest and dense experimental plantations. The campus is situated at an altitude of 670 m. above mean sea level and receives over 200 cm of rainfall annually. It can be best approached from Dehradun city through Chakrata road.

The hostels, guest house, auditorium and playgrounds of the academy are also located in the campus, whereas the housing colony for the faculty and staff is located on Chakrata road opposite the New Forest campus.

See also
Forest Research Institute (India)
Indian Council of Forestry Research and Education
 Van Vigyan Kendra (VVK) Forest Science Centres
 Indian Forest Service
 Head of Forest Forces

Official Links
 Indira Gandhi National Forest Academy
 Lal Bahadur Shastri National Academy of Administration

Forestry education in India
Education in Dehradun
Environment of Uttarakhand
Indian Council of Forestry Research and Education
Ministry of Environment, Forest and Climate Change
Organisations based in Uttarakhand
Educational institutions established in 1938
Research institutes established in 1938
1938 establishments in India
Monuments and memorials to Indira Gandhi
Environmental organisations based in India